The International Federation of Musicians (FIM) is a global union federation bringing together trade unions representing music performers. FIM counts member unions in 70 countries and three regional groups in Europe, Africa and Latin America. It is a member of the Council of Global Unions.

History
The federation was established on 3 August 1948 at a conference in Zurich, which had been organised on the initiative of the Swiss Musicians' Union.  From 1951, it held meetings with the members of the Berne Convention, the International Labour Organization, the IFPI, and the European Broadcasting Union, to negotiate the copyright rights of musicians.

For many years, the secretariat was independent of both the main international federations of trade unions, the International Confederation of Free Trade Unions and the World Federation of Trade Unions, and as such, by the 1980s, it represented both unions in capitalist countries, and in communist countries such as Cuba.

In 1997, the organisation affiliated to the International Arts and Entertainment Alliance. The secretariat is currently based in Paris, France.

Affiliates
The following unions were affiliated in March 2022:

Leadership

General Secretaries
1948: Rudolf Leuzinger
1982: Yvonne Burckhardt
1990s: Jean Vincent
2002: Benoît Machuel

Presidents
1948: William Batten
1950: Hardie Ratcliffe
1973: John Morton
2004: John F. Smith

External links
 Official FIM website
 Official website of the International Orchestra Conference
 Travelling with a musical instrument in compliance with CITES
 Official website of the International Arts and Entertainment Alliance (IAEA)

References

Trade unions established in 1948
Global union federations
Musicians' trade unions